Tal Erel (טל אראל;  born June 16, 1996) is an Israeli baseball player for the Israel National Baseball Team. He has played college baseball at Lynn University. He played for Team Israel at the 2020 Summer Olympics in Tokyo in the summer of 2021.

Early life
Erel was born in Ramat Gan, Israel, to Yaron and Galit Erel, and lived for a time in Miami, Florida (from ages six to ten), and Givatayim, Israel. He has two siblings, Hadar and Tomer. He served in the Israel Defense Forces from 2014–17.

Baseball career

Europe
In 2016 Erel played for the Tempo Titans Prague in the Czech Republic 1st League. In 2017 he played for the UVV Utrecht in the Netherlands 1st League.

College
In 2017-18 he attended Miami Dade College.  He then played baseball for the Palm Beach State College Panthers as a switch-hitting catcher, as he studied Business Administration. He graduated in 2019 with an Associate in Arts degree, and was one of two Palm Beach players who  won both the Florida College System Activities Association Academic Award and the National Junior College Athletic Association Academic Award.

Starting in September 2019 he was a sophomore at Lynn University, and played baseball for the university's Fighting Knights. He is an investment management major, and earned a BA in 2021. If he plays on Team Israel in the 2020 Olympics he will be the second student-athlete in the university's history to compete in the Olympics, joining Melissa Ortiz who represented Colombia women's soccer in 2012 and 2016.

Team Israel
Erel has been a member of the Israel national baseball team since 2011. He served as the bullpen catcher for the Team Israel at the 2017 World Baseball Classic. He appeared in three games as catcher as the team played in the 2019 European Baseball Championship - B-Pool in early July 2019 in Blagoevgrad, Bulgaria, winning all of its games and advancing to the playoffs against Team Lithuania in the 2019 Playoff Series at the end of July 2019 for the last qualifying spot for the 2019 European Baseball Championship.

He played for Team Israel at the 2019 European Baseball Championship, batting .300 in ten at bats. Erel also played for the team at the Africa/Europe 2020 Olympic Qualification tournament in Italy in September 2019, which Israel won to qualify to play baseball at the 2020 Summer Olympics in Tokyo.

He played for Team Israel at the 2020 Summer Olympics in Tokyo in the summer of 2021, at catcher and as a pinch hitter.

References

External links
Tal Erel homepage

1996 births
Living people
Baseball catchers
Israeli baseball players
People from Ramat Gan
People from Givatayim
Baseball players from Miami
21st-century Israeli military personnel
Miami Dade College alumni
Palm Beach State Panthers baseball players
2019 European Baseball Championship players
Lynn Fighting Knights baseball players
Baseball players at the 2020 Summer Olympics
Olympic baseball players of Israel